Nina K. Martin is an associate professor of film studies at Connecticut College and the author of Sexy Thrills: Undressing the Erotic Thriller.

Education 
Martin received her B.S. at Ithaca College, her M.A. at New York University, and her Ph.D. at Northwestern University, in the Women's Studies Certificate Program of the Department of Radio-Television-Film.

References 

Connecticut College faculty
American academics
Ithaca College alumni
Living people
New York University alumni
Northwestern University alumni
Feminism and the arts
Year of birth missing (living people)